"Here Comes the King" is a song by American rapper Snoop Lion featuring Angela Hunte. Was released on December 3, 2012 as the first single of his twelfth studio album Reincarnated, with the record labels Berhane Sound System, Vice Records, Mad Decent and RCA.

Music video 
The official video was released on February 12, 2013 in the singer account at VEVO platform. The music video was directed by Hatem Abusitta.

Track listing 
Download digital
Here Comes the King (featuring Angela Hunte) — 3:24

Chart performance

References

2012 singles
2012 songs
Snoop Dogg songs
Songs written by Snoop Dogg
Song recordings produced by Ariel Rechtshaid
Songs written by Ariel Rechtshaid
Songs written by Diplo
Songs written by Angela Hunte